Calvin Turner Jr. (born July 6, 1999) is an American football running back and wide receiver for the San Antonio Brahmas of the XFL. He previously played at Jacksonville University until the program shut down in 2019 and University of Hawaii from 2020-2021. Turner has been praised for his versatility, having taken snaps at defensive back, quarterback, running back, and wide receiver during his college career.

High school career 
Turner attended New Hampstead High School in Bloomingdale, Georgia, where he was a four-sport athlete, playing football, basketball, baseball, as well as running track. As a high school senior, he was a dual-threat quarterback who rushed for over 1,700 yards and 15 touchdowns, while also passing for 1,450 yards and 10 touchdowns en route to being named the Savannah Morning News' Most Versatile Male Athlete in 2017.

College career

Jacksonville 
As a true freshman, Turner's athletic ability was praised by the Jacksonville coaches, so they transitioned him to a defensive back and return specialist to get him playing time. Turner excelled in the secondary, leading the team in total pass breakups and was fifth on the team in tackles and garnering an All-Pioneer Football League honorable mention after the season.

Turner transitioned back to quarterback before the 2018 season, and was immediately named the starting quarterback. In an option offense, he set program records in single-season rushing touchdowns and was 36 yards away from breaking the single-season rushing yards record before he broke his leg in the season finale against Dayton. He was named an honorable mention to the All-Pioneer Football League at the end of the season.

Turner continued to excel in 2019, rushing for over 1,300 yards and 15 touchdowns while also being named to the All-Pioneer Football League First Team as an all-purpose player.

When the program folded in 2019, Turner announced he would transfer to Hawaii for his final season of eligibility.

Hawaii 
As a quarterback in an option offense at Jacksonville, Turner transitioned into a running back at Hawaii, later seeing time at wide receiver as well as fielding kicks. In his debut with the Rainbow Warriors, Turner scored two touchdowns on 8 carries for 61 yards against Fresno State. He also had a three-touchdown performance in a loss against Boise State, which put him as the team leader in total touchdowns with seven.

In the Rainbow Warriors' bowl game against Houston in the New Mexico Bowl, Turner had 252 all-purpose yards highlighted by a 75-yard touchdown reception and a New Mexico Bowl record 92-yard kickoff return in the victory. Turner was named the game's most outstanding player on offense for his efforts.

Turner was named to the All-Mountain West second team at the end of the season as a wide receiver and was also named an honorable mention All-American by Phil Steele.

With the NCAA approving a waiver that allowed their 2020 class standing to be retained in 2021 in response to the COVID-19 pandemic, Turner announced he would return to Hawaii for the 2021 season rather than entering his name in the upcoming NFL draft.

Professional career

San Antonio Brahmas 
On November 17, 2022, Turner was drafted by the San Antonio Brahmas of the XFL.

References

External links 
 
 Hawaii profile
 Jacksonville profile

1999 births
Living people
Players of American football from Savannah, Georgia
American football quarterbacks
American football defensive backs
American football running backs
American football wide receivers
American football return specialists
Jacksonville Dolphins football players
Hawaii Rainbow Warriors football players
San Antonio Brahmas players